The Battle of Puerto de Baños (12 August 1809) saw a Portuguese-Spanish column led by Robert Wilson attempt to defend a mountain pass against Marshal Michel Ney's VI Corps. After a nine-hour combat, Wilson's force broke up and scattered into the mountains. The clash occurred during the Peninsular War, part of a larger struggle known as the Napoleonic Wars.

Background
In the summer of 1809, the British army of Arthur Wellesley, 1st Duke of Wellington marched into western Spain to join Gregorio García de la Cuesta's Spanish army. Wilson's 3,500-man Portuguese-Spanish force served as the left flank guard of this offensive. The Allied armies defeated King Joseph Bonaparte's Imperial French army at Talavera at the end of July. However, the threat of Marshal Nicolas Soult's large army to the north soon forced Wellesley and Cuesta to withdraw to the west.

Battle
Having advanced to Escalona, Wilson found himself isolated by the sudden concentration of French forces. The Portuguese-Spanish force successfully dodged some French intercepting columns by taking to the mountains. At Puerto de Baños, Wilson found Ney's corps marching north to cross the pass and decided to fight. After a skillful defense, Wilson's troops were finally defeated, but they escaped into Portugal without further incident.

Further reading

External links
 

Battles of the Peninsular War
Battles of the Napoleonic Wars
Conflicts in 1809
Battles involving France
Battles involving Portugal
Battles involving Spain
1809 in Spain
August 1809 events